Edwin 'Ted' Smith was an English footballer who most notably played for Crystal Palace as a striker.

Born in Birmingham, Smith first started his career at Hull and was then spotted by Crystal Palace and was signed in 1911. Smith was regarded as one of Palace's greatest strikers and is their second all-time top goalscorer, with 124 goals.

References

External links 
 http://www.holmesdale.net/page.php?id=111&player=985

English footballers
Association football forwards
Year of birth missing
Year of death missing
Crystal Palace F.C. players